Lechowski is a Polish surname. Notable people with the surname include:

Przemysław Lechowski (born 1977), Polish classical pianist
 (born 1985), Spanish rapper born in Poland

Polish-language surnames